The City of Carlisle Electric Tramways Company operated an electric tramway service in Carlisle between 1900 and 1931.

History

The Carlisle Tramways Order of 1898 authorised the construction of an electric tramway and construction began in 1899. The system comprised 6 lines radiating from Carlisle railway station to Newtown, Stanwix, along Warwick Road to Petteril Bridge, London Road, Boundary Road and Denton Holme.

The tramway was operated by the City of Carlisle Electric Tramways Co Ltd, power being taken from the Corporation's supply station in James Street and opened for public service on 30 June 1900

In 1911 the concern was sold to Balfour Beatty who undertook track renewals and replaced the fleet of tramcars at a cost of £18,000 (equivalent to £ in ).

After the First World War, the company was unable to expand the services to meet the needs of an expanding town, and had started its own motorbuses services. In 1926 it changed its name to Carlisle and District Transport Company.

Fleet
1-15 Electric Railway and Tramway Carriage Works 1900 – disposed of in 1912
1-12 United Electric Car Company 1912
13 Second hand car (1903) from Ilkeston Corporation Tramways obtained in 1920
14 English Electric 1925
15 English Electric 1923

Closure

Carlisle Corporation purchased the assets of the company on 5 March 1931, and after being unable to get agreement with local bus operators and secure an operating licence, 
closed the tramway system on 21 November 1931. In 2011, plans were made to send the remains of a Carlisle tram to Workington for partial restoration and in 2013 it was announced that this was about to begin using Wolverhampton Corporation Tramways number 49, based at Black Country Living Museum, as a model.

References

Tram transport in England
History of Carlisle, Cumbria
Companies based in Carlisle, Cumbria
3 ft 6 in gauge railways in England